Walton Rowing Club is an amateur rowing club, on the River Thames in England. Its large, modern, combined club and boat house is on the Surrey bank of the Thames, facing the Walton Mile straight, at Walton-on-Thames about 400 metres above Sunbury Lock cut. The club organises several rowing events, and members have competed at international level.

History and events
The initial establishment of a club and affiliation to the Amateur Rowing Association took place in 1927 with the contribution of members of Thames Rowing Club and Kingston Rowing Club and including active members of Thames Valley Skiff Club and the now defunct Oatlands Rowing Club. The club's first President was Steve Fairbairn.  Activities ceased during World War II and in the postwar period much effort was spent on establishing a clubhouse and boat house. This was the forerunner to the present building at the end of Sunbury Lane, 1953 to 2011.

The Club incepted Walton Amateur Regatta, and co-organises its merged-with-Weybridge Regatta successor Walton and Weybridge Regatta. It organises in its own right since 1978 Walton Small Boats Head, a major December event in the rowing calendar.

The club was the first to have competed at National Schools Regatta as a non-school club – this was in 1976.

Notable members
The most successful Senior international rower who trained almost contemporaneously at the club was Steve Trapmore, who stroked the winning Great Britain men's eight at the Sydney 2000 Summer Olympics and won a World Championship title two years later in a GB four. He went on to retire with a back injury in 2003 and become a longstanding Olympic Rowing Programme and head Cambridge University coach. The club has for many decades taught to row and scull many juniors and adults.

After the setting up of the Bisham and Caversham Lakes training centres, and advent of lottery funding, only a very small number of clubs in England see any training from the Great Britain squad members.

Many former members, after Walton Rowing Club experience at national championship level and/or international events, have become part of the Great Britain squads, some having secured a university rowing scholarship or access to the regional elite start programmes. While members or recently re-affiliated, nine men's juniors between 2007 and 2013 were selected for World Juniors, or World U23s.

Honours

British champions

Henley Royal Regatta

1 With Trent Rowing Club
2 In other years: Runners-Up (composite: half of crew) four times since the event's 1992 inception, and as entire crew once, 2011.

See also
Rowing on the River Thames

References

External links
 Walton Rowing Club official website

Sports clubs established in 1927
Rowing clubs of the River Thames
Sport in Surrey
Rowing clubs in England